The flapnose conger (Parabathymyrus oregoni) is an eel in the family Congridae (conger/garden eels). It was described by David G. Smith and Robert H. Kanazawa in 1977. It is a tropical, marine eel which is known from French Guiana, in the western central Atlantic Ocean. It is known to dwell at a depth of 210 metres.

References

Congridae
Taxa named by David G. Smith
Taxa named by Robert H. Kanazawa
Fish described in 1977